Sweetognathidae is an extinct family of conodonts in the order Ozarkodinida.

References

External links 

 

Ozarkodinida families